Karl Wilhelm Ritter von Kupffer (born Karl Wilhelm Kupffer;  – 16 December 1902) was a Baltic German anatomist who discovered stellate macrophage cells that bear his name.

Academic career 
He was the eldest son of pastor Karl Hermann Kupffer (1797-1860). In 1854, he obtained his medical doctorate from the University of Dorpat, where shortly afterwards he served as an assistant to Friedrich Heinrich Bidder (1810-1894). In 1856-57 he took a scientific journey to Vienna, Berlin and Göttingen, an extended trip in which he studied physiology with Emil Du Bois-Reymond (1818-1896) and Johannes Peter Müller (1801-1858). Afterwards, he returned to Dorpat, where he later became an associate professor.

In 1866 he was appointed chair of anatomy at the University of Kiel, and several years later relocated to Königsberg (1875) as a professor of anatomy. From 1880 until his retirement in 1901, Kupffer held the chair of anatomy at the University of Munich.

Scientific research 
Kupffer is largely known for his work in the fields of neuroanatomy and embryology. He conducted studies on the development of the brain, spleen, pancreas and kidneys, also performing research involving innervation of exocrine gland and doing investigations on early differentiation of mesoderm. While Bidder's assistant at Dorpat, he studied structures of the central nervous system, and during his tenure at Königsberg, he had the opportunity to examine the cranium of philosopher Immanuel Kant.

In regards to his discovery of "Kupffer cells" in 1876, he initially suggested that this type of cell belonged to a group of perivascular cells (pericytes) of the connective tissues or to the adventitial cells. Two decades later (1898), he revised his earlier analysis, stating that the cells form an essential component of the vascular walls and correlate to the specific cells of endothelium, capable of phagocytising foreign materials. Shortly afterwards, pathologist Tadeusz Browicz (1847-1928) from Jagellonian University in Krakow, correctly identified them as macrophages.

Selected works 
 De medullae spinalis textura in ranis ratione imprimis habita indolis substantiae cinerae, 1854
 Der Schädel von Immanuel Kant, Archiv für Anthropologie, Band 13
 Über Sternzellen in der Leber, brief an Prof. Waldyer, 1876, Archiv, Mikroskopische Anatomie, 12, 352-358
 (with Berthold Benecke): Photogramme zur Ontogenie der Vogel, etc. 1879. 
 Über die sogennanten Sternzellen der Säugethierleber, Archiv, Mikroskopische Anatomie, 1899, 54, 254-288
 Über Sternzellen der Leber, Versammlung 1898, Veröffentlicht 1898, anatomische Geselschaft.

See also
 List of Baltic German scientists

References
 This article contains information based on a translation of an equivalent article at the German Wikipedia.

1829 births
1902 deaths
People from Tukums Municipality
People from Courland Governorate
Baltic-German people
German biochemists
German anatomists
German histologists
German embryologists
German curators
Academic staff of the Ludwig Maximilian University of Munich
Academic staff of the University of Kiel
Academic staff of the University of Königsberg